Clifton House and Mill Site is a historic home and grist mill site located near Royal, Franklin County, North Carolina.  It was built in the 1850s, and is a two-story, rectangular frame house with a hipped roof in the Greek Revival style with Italianate design elements.  It features a two-story pedimented front porch and has a two-story rear ell.  Also on the property are two contributing 19th-century outbuildings, Miller's House, and the ruins of a grist mill built about 1831, including some machinery.

It was listed on the National Register of Historic Places in 1980.

References

Houses on the National Register of Historic Places in North Carolina
Greek Revival houses in North Carolina
Italianate architecture in North Carolina
Houses completed in 1850
Houses in Franklin County, North Carolina
National Register of Historic Places in Franklin County, North Carolina